Cephus cinctus, also known as wheat stem sawfly, is a slow flying, yellow and black coloured, destructive pest found mainly in western North America.

Habit and habitat
The adult fly grows to a length of 7 to 12 mm.  Males are considerably smaller than females. However, they are delicate and short lived.

Host
The species has a wide host range that includes all large-stemmed grasses except oats, Avena sativa L.
(Macedo et al. 2005a).

Distribution
It is known as a chronic pest in Northern Great Plains of the United States and also an important pest of wheat in the Canadian Prairies. The species is distributed widely in various regions of the US and Canada.

References

Further reading

Cephidae
Hymenoptera of North America
Insects described in 1872